Dulan may refer to:

Dulan Khan or Tulan Qaghan, a khan of the Göktürk empire from 588 to 599
Dulan County, in Qinghai Province, China
Dulan, Iran, a village in East Azerbaijan Province, Iran
Dulan (Vranje), a village in Serbia
Dulan (都蘭), Taiwan, a village in Taitiung County, Taiwan